Freestyle skiing was an official sport discipline for the first time at the 1992 Winter Olympics, with medals awarded in the moguls event. The venue was Tignes about 85 km from host city Albertville.

Medal summary

Medal table 

The hosts from France led the medal table, with a gold and a silver medal, both in the men's moguls.

Men's Events

Women's Events

Participating NOCs

Eighteen nations participated in freestyle skiing at Albertville.

Demonstration events

Six years after the first World Championships in Tignes, while moguls were an official medal event, aerials and ballets were demonstration events; for the second time after Calgary. Aerials were dominated by the Canadians and in particular by the world champion Philippe LaRoche and by Nicolas Fontaine. Didier Méda from France, who placed second in Calgary, placed third. The women's event was won by Colette Brand from Switzerland.

For the ballet, a bit similar to figure skating but on snow, Lane Spina from the US, second in Calgary, took the third place behind Kristiansen who had put emphasis on his aerial performances. Both of them were defeated by Fabrice Becker from France who won points on composition and style for a well choreographed tango performance. Among the women, Conny Kissling won her 102nd victory, in front of Cathy Féchoz from Courchevel.

Men's Aerials

Men's Ballet

Women's Aerials

Women's Ballet

References

External links

 
1992
1992 Winter Olympics events
1992 in freestyle skiing